Auckland University Press is a New Zealand publisher that produces creative and scholarly work for a general audience. Founded in 1966 and formally recognised as Auckland University Press in 1972, it is an independent publisher based within The University of Auckland, Auckland, New Zealand. The Press currently  publishes around 20 new books a year in history and politics, art and architecture, literature and poetry, Māori, Pacific and Asian Studies, science, business and health. It published its 500th book in 2005 of which 22 were prize winning publications.

Awards
Auckland University Press won the Most Beautiful Books Australia & New Zealand Award (2013) and its authors have won a number of national prizes.

Imprints
1966–1970: Published for the University of Auckland by the Oxford University Press

1970–1986: Auckland University Press/Oxford University Press

1986–: Auckland University Press

1995–1998: a small number of books carried the imprint Auckland University Press/Bridget Williams Books

See also
 Holloway Press

References

External links
Auckland University Press website
Short video history of Auckland University Press
Book Publishers Association of New Zealand listing

Book publishing companies of New Zealand
University presses of New Zealand
University of Auckland
Publishing companies established in 1966
Mass media in Auckland
1966 establishments in New Zealand
Academic publishing companies